Gilwern Halt railway station was a station on the London and North Western Railway's Heads of the Valleys line near the village of Gilwern in the Welsh county of Brecknockshire.

History
The line was leased and operated by the London and North Western Railway (L&NWR) which acquired the smaller railway company on 30 June 1866. The L&NWR was itself amalgamated into the London, Midland and Scottish Railway in the 1923 Grouping.

Gilwern first appeared in Bradshaw in April 1863, however the line's engineer, John Gardner, had reported on 27 January 1863 that it was due for completion in three or four weeks and on 6 August he confirmed that it had been open for five months which suggests the actual opening took place in late February or early March. The station was situated in a cutting which was crossed by a road bridge at the western end of the station. It was also convenient for the Brecknock and Abergavenny Canal and for this reason attracted a good summer passenger traffic as the Sunday schools in the area had afternoon outings to spend by the canal.

It had two curved platforms with the 'Up' platform higher than the 'Down' as a result of the curvature. A timber-built station building was situated on the 'Up' platform while a wooden passenger shelter was provided on the 'Down' platform. Steps led upwards from the 'Down' platform to the road bridge. To the east was Gilwern Stone Quarry which was served by a siding branching off from the Down line. The siding was controlled by a signal box which was in operation from 1890 to  when the siding had been removed. In , the station was downgraded to a railway halt at around the same time as Trevil.

Decline in local industry and the costs of working the line between Abergavenny and Merthyr led to the cessation of passenger services on 4 January 1958. The last public service over the line was an SLS railtour on 5 January 1958 hauled by LNWR 0-8-0 49121 and LNWR Coal Tank No. 58926. Official closure came on 6 January.

Present
The platforms have survived and the trackbed through the station is part of National Cycle Route 46.

References

Notes

Sources

Disused railway stations in Monmouthshire
Former London and North Western Railway stations
Railway stations in Great Britain opened in 1863
Railway stations in Great Britain closed in 1958